John Herbert Duggan (December 17, 1897 – February 3, 1977) was a Canadian ice hockey player who played 27 games in the National Hockey League with the Ottawa Senators during the 1925–26 season. Born in Ottawa, Duggan had a lengthily career in the Ottawa City Hockey League prior to joining the NHL. He died at an Ottawa hospital in 1977 and is interred at Notre Dame Cemetery.

Career statistics

Regular season and playoffs

References

External links
 

1897 births
1977 deaths
Canadian ice hockey left wingers
Ice hockey people from Ottawa
London Panthers players
Niagara Falls Cataracts players
Ottawa Senators (1917) players